St. George Syro-Malabar Catholic Basilica is a basilica of the Syro-Malabar Catholic Church in Angamaly, Kerala, India. The current basilica building was constructed under the leadership of Paul Kariatty and it was consecrated on 31 December 2006.

On 24 June 2009, Pope Benedict XVI raised St George Forane Church to the status of minor basilica. Together with an underground parish hall where wedding gatherings are commonly held, it covers about 24,000 sq ft (2,200 m2). It has three chandeliers that are switched on daily during the Holy Qurbana.
, 

, the Rector of the basilica is Very Rev. Dr. Jimmy Poochakkatt.

Assist Vicars are:

Fr.Sibin Manayampilly & Fr.Arun Therully

References

Sources
 
 
 
 
 

Churches in Angamaly
Basilica churches in Kerala
Syro-Malabar Catholic church buildings
5th-century churches